The 2014 season was Kashima Antlers' 22nd consecutive season in J.League Division 1, the top flight of Japanese football since the introduction of professional football in 1993. The club finished the 2014 J.League Division 1 in third place, two places above their position from the previous season. They also competed in the Emperor's Cup where they were surprisingly knocked out in the second round by JFL club Sony Sendai FC and the J.League Cup where they did not make it past the group stage.

Squad

Season squad

Competitions

J.League Division 1

League table

Results summary

Results by matchday

Results

Emperor's Cup 

Kashima entered into the tournament in the second round, looking to improve on their fourth round exit in 2013. They had drawn and beaten their second round opponents, JFL club Sony Sendai in the second round the previous year, but one of the shocks of the tournament was Kashima's extra time and penalties defeat.

J.League Cup 

As one of the fourteen teams not to receive a bye, Kashima entered into Group A with six other J.League Division 1 clubs. After winning three of their six games in the competition, they finished fourth in the group stage and therefore did not qualify for the quarter-finals.

Group stage

Statistics

Appearances

Goalscorers 
The list is sorted by shirt number when total goals are equal.

Clean sheets
The list is sorted by shirt number when total clean sheets are equal.

References 

Kashima Antlers
Kashima Antlers seasons